Agent F.O.X., also known as The Firefox of Bunnington Burrows, is a 2015 Chinese computer-animated fantasy adventure film directed by Ge Shuiying. The film was released on October 30, 2015 in both 2D and 3D.

Plot 
Super spy Agent F.O.X. arrives in Carrot Town intending to complete one objective, which is to infiltrate the community of friendly rabbits and locate a mysterious artifact. The mission goes awry, however, when the secret agent is mistaken for a distant cousin.

Voice cast
 Qiao Shiyu as 017 
 Yu Zhou as Princess
 Zhang Yaohan as Foretooth King
 Shang Hong as Big Eye Rabbit
 Xuan Xiaoming as Big Tiger
 Chen Hao as Shadow-less Rabbit
 Zhang Wei as Day-dreaming Rabbit
 Li Zhiwei as Captain Fox

Box office
The film has earned  (US$209,000) at the Chinese box office.

References

External links
 

2015 films
2015 3D films
2015 computer-animated films
2010s fantasy adventure films
Chinese 3D films
Chinese computer-animated films
Chinese animated fantasy films
3D animated films
Animated adventure films
Animated action films
Animated films about foxes
Animated films about rabbits and hares
2010s Mandarin-language films